Reid is a former Commonwealth Railways settlement on the Trans-Australian Railway. It was established in 1916 on the Nullarbor Plain in Western Australia, when the railway was under construction. 

When freight and passenger trains were hauled by steam locomotives, the population was about a dozen railway employee families, of whom most breadwinners worked on refreshing the locomotives with water and coal and maintaining the railway track. A school in the town educated the families' children. From 1951, when diesel locomotives were introduced, it was only necessary to have one stop on the entire railway for diesel fuel (for the engine) and water (for the passenger cars), and the number of employees was reduced at places such as Reid. 

The settlement remained until the 1970s, when track repairs were highly mechanised; later, maintenance was further reduced by continuously welded rail and pre-stressed concrete sleepers. Buildings were demolished and by 2019 few remnants were left.

References

City of Kalgoorlie–Boulder